Haplochromis prognathus is a species of cichlid endemic to Lake Victoria.  This species can reach a length of  SL.

References

prognathus
Fish of Lake Victoria
Fish described in 1904
Taxonomy articles created by Polbot